Cyrtodactylus brevidactylus is a nocturnal and terrestrial species of gecko that is found in Myanmar. It is an insectivore and eats most insects and arthropods that it comes across.

References 

 Bauer, A.M. 2003. Descriptions of seven new Cyrtodactylus (Squamata: Gekkonidae) with a key to the species of Myanmar (Burma). Proceedings of the California Academy of Sciences, 54: 463-498
 Atlas de la terrariophile Vol.3 : les lézards. Animalia Éditions, 2003. 

Cyrtodactylus
Endemic fauna of Myanmar
Reptiles of Myanmar
Reptiles described in 2002